California's 48th State Assembly district is one of 80 California State Assembly districts. It is currently represented by Democrat Blanca Rubio of Baldwin Park.

District profile 
The district encompasses the eastern San Gabriel Valley, along with several foothill communities. The district is primarily suburban and heavily Latino.

Los Angeles County – 4.7%
 Azusa
 Baldwin Park
 Bradbury
 Covina
 Duarte
 El Monte – 37.9%
 Glendora
 Irwindale
 Monrovia – 0.7%
 Valinda
 West Covina – 71.3%

Election results from statewide races

List of Assembly Members 
Due to redistricting, the 48th district has been moved around different parts of the state. The current iteration resulted from the 2011 redistricting by the California Citizens Redistricting Commission.

Election results 1992 - present

2020

2018

2016

2014

2012

2010

2008

2006

2004

2002

2000

1998

1996

1994

1992

See also 
 California State Assembly
 California State Assembly districts
 Districts in California

References

External links 
 District map from the California Citizens Redistricting Commission

48
Government of Los Angeles County, California
San Gabriel Valley
Azusa, California
Baldwin Park, California
Covina, California
Duarte, California
El Monte, California
Glendora, California
City of Industry, California
Irwindale, California
Monrovia, California
West Covina, California